Zhomart Satubaldin (born July 11, 1975 in Alma-Ata) is a Kazakhstani sprint canoer who competed in the early to mid-2000s. He won a bronze medal in the C-1 200 m event at the 2005 ICF Canoe Sprint World Championships in Zagreb.

Satubaldin also finished seventh in the C-2 500 m event at the 2000 Summer Olympics in Sydney. He also competed in the C-2 1000 m at those same games, but was eliminated in the semifinal round.

References

Sports-reference.com profile

1975 births
Canoeists at the 2000 Summer Olympics
Kazakhstani male canoeists
Living people
Sportspeople from Almaty
Olympic canoeists of Kazakhstan
Asian Games medalists in canoeing
ICF Canoe Sprint World Championships medalists in Canadian
Canoeists at the 2006 Asian Games
Medalists at the 2006 Asian Games
Asian Games silver medalists for Kazakhstan